Thokozani Makhosonke Langa is a South African politician who was elected to the National Assembly of South Africa in the 2019 general election as a member of the Economic Freedom Fighters (EFF) party.

Langa was an alternate member of the Portfolio Committee on Mineral Resources and Energy; he had previously served as a member of the Portfolio Committee on Small Business Development.

In March 2021, Langa was one of fourteen EFF MPs who the Power and Privileges Committee of Parliament recommended a sanction of a fine not exceeding the equivalent of one month's salary and allowances for disrupting Minister Pravin Gordhan's budget vote speech on 11 July 2019.

Langa resigned from Parliament with effect from 3 February 2023.

On 10 March 2023, Langa was welcomed into the Inkatha Freedom Party after he had resigned from the EFF. Langa accused the EFF of being a corrupt and ungovernable party.

References

Living people
Zulu people
Inkatha Freedom Party politicians
Year of birth missing (living people)
Economic Freedom Fighters politicians
Members of the National Assembly of South Africa